Wessberg is a surname. Notable people with the surname include:

Linda Wessberg (born 1980), Swedish golfer 
Wes Wessberg (born 1939), American cyclist

See also
Weisberg